Barbian is a comune (municipality) in South Tyrol in northern Italy, located about  northeast of Bolzano.

Geography

Barbian borders the following municipalities: Kastelruth, Lajen, Waidbruck, Ritten, and Villanders.

Frazioni
The municipality of Barbian contains the frazioni (subdivisions, mainly villages and hamlets) Kollmann (Colma), St. Gertraud (Santa Gertrude), Saubach.

History

Place-name
The city is mentioned for the first time in 994 as Parpian, the name deriving probably from the Latin personal name Barbius, a name also attested in Venetic inscriptions from the Roman era.

Coat-of-arms
The shield is tierced per fess in argent, vert and sable. In the second level are represented three churches: St. Nicholas, St. Gertrude and St. Magdalene, which are located in the mountains above the village. The sable bottom is crossed by a thin band of argent and gules, symbolizing the customs bar of the village of Kollmann sited in the municipality. The arms were granted in 1970.

Society

Linguistic distribution
According to the 2011 census, 97.53% of the population speak German, 1.87% Italian and 0.60% Ladin as first language.

Demographic evolution

References

External links

  Homepage of the municipality

Municipalities of South Tyrol